The 1974 Newham London Borough Council election was held on 2 May 1974.  The entire Newham London Borough Council was up for election. Turnout was 19.9%. Four of the wards had incumbents that were re-elected unopposed.

Election result

|}

Background
A total of 133 candidates stood in the election for the 60 seats being contested across 24 wards. 9 seats in four wards were elected unopposed. Candidates included a full slate from the Labour Party, while the Liberal and Conservative parties stood 16 and 21 respectively. Other candidates included 22 Residents & Ratepayers, 5 Communists and 6 National Front.

Results by ward

Beckton

Bemersyde

Canning Town & Grange

Castle

Central

Custom House & Silvertown

Forest Gate

Greatfield

Hudsons

Kensington

Little Ilford

Manor Park

New Town

Ordnance

Park

Plaistow

Plashet

St Stephens

South

Stratford

Upton

Wall End

West Ham

Woodgrange

By-elections between 1974 and 1978

Manor Park

Canning Town & Grange

Hudsons

References

1974
1974 London Borough council elections